The 1954 LEN European Aquatics Championships were held 31 August – 5 September in Turin, Italy. In swimming, butterfly events were contested for the first time; 100 m for women and 200 m for men.

Medal table

Medal summary

Diving
Men's events

Women's events

Swimming
Men's events

Women's events

Water polo

See also
List of European Championships records in swimming

References

European Championships
European Aquatics Championships
LEN European Aquatics Championships
International aquatics competitions hosted by Italy
European Aquatics
1950s in Turin
European Aquatics Championships
European Aquatics Championships